Mueang Nakhon Ratchasima is one of 32 districts of Nakhon Ratchasima province, northeastern Thailand.

Overview

Nakhon Ratchasima was built in the reign of King Narai the Great of Ayutthaya kingdom. The king merged two cities, Mueang Sema and Mueang Khorakha Pura (Khorat), and moved to the present area. He named the new city "Nakhon Ratchasima".

"Khorat", as it is commonly known, is on the Khorat plateau, the lower part of northeastern plateau of Thailand. The city itself serves as the gateway to the northeastern region. From Bangkok, it is 259 km by road.

Geography
Neighbouring districts are (from the north clockwise): Non Thai, Non Sung, Chaloem Phra Kiat, Chok Chai, Pak Thong Chai, Sung Noen, and Kham Thale So.

The main river through the district is the Lam Takhong.

Administration
The district is divided into 25 sub-districts (tambons) with 27 local administrations.

The district contains 9 sub-district municipalities (thesaban tambon) and one city municipality (thesaban nakhon). The City of Nakhon Ratchasima or Korat City, covers the area of Nai Mueang Sub-district (tambon) and parts of Ban Ko Sub-district. Nine township municipalities (thesaban tambons): Pho Klang covers Pho Klang Sub-district; Hua Thale covers Hua Tale Sub-district; Nong Phai Lom covers Nong Phai Lom Sub-district; Cho Ho covers parts of Cho Ho Sub-district and parts of Ban Ko Sub-district; Khok Sung covers Khok Sung Sub-district; Pru Yai covers Pru Yai Sub-district; Khok Kruat and Mueang Mai Khok Kruat cover Khok Kruat Sub-district; Nong Khai Nam covers Nong Khai Nam Sub-district.

And 17 Subdistrict Administrative Organizations (SAO): Ban Ko, Ban Mai, Ban Pho, Chai Mongkhon, Cho Ho, Maroeng, Muen Wai, Nong Bua Sala, Nong Chabok, Nong Krathum, Nong Rawiang, Phanao, Phon Krang, Phutsa, Si Num, Suranaree and Talat responsible for the non-municipal areas.

References

Nakhon Ratchasima
Mueang Nakhon Ratchasima